These are the official results of the Men's 4 x 100 metres relay event at the 2003 IAAF World Championships in Paris, France. Their final was held on 31 August 2003 at 17:50h.

Final

Semifinals
Held on Saturday 2003-08-30

Heat 1

Heat 2

Heats
Held on Saturday 2003-08-30

Heat 1

Heat 2

Heat 3

Heat 4

References
 Results

 
Relays at the World Athletics Championships